Mibora, or sandgrass, is a genus of European and North African plants in the grass family.

Description 
As in all grasses the leaves consist at its base of a sheath closely enveloping the culm, a free standing blade at its tip and a ligule at the inside/upside where sheath and blade meet. The ligule is membranaceus and lacks fine hairs (or cilia). The spikelets consist of one fertile floret, which has 3 anthers.

Key to the species

References 

Poaceae genera
Bunchgrasses of Africa
Bunchgrasses of Europe
Taxa named by Michel Adanson
Pooideae